Sant’Eufemia Buffalora is a station of the Brescia Metro, in the city of Brescia in northern Italy. Originally named "Sant'Eufemia", the addition of "Buffalora" more closely reflects the location of the station.

As the easterly terminus of the metro line, the station serves not only the nearby towns of Sant'Eufemia della Fonte and Buffalora, but also Rezzato and more distant traffic coming from Montichiari and Gavardo and communities near Lake Garda. For this reason, it is planned to build a large parking-lot near the station.

References

External links

Brescia Metro stations
Railway stations opened in 2013
2013 establishments in Italy
Railway stations in Italy opened in the 21st century